
 
 

Thornlea is a locality in the Australian state of South Australia located in the state's south-east within the Limestone Coast region about  south east of the state capital of Adelaide and about  north-west of the municipal seat of Millicent.

Boundaries for the locality were created on 18 December 1997.

The land use in the locality is ‘primary production’. A protected area known as the Belt Hill Conservation Park is located in the locality's south-east corner on the boundary with Hatherleigh.

Thornlea is located within the federal division of Barker, the state electoral district of MacKillop and the local government area of the Wattle Range Council.

References

Towns in South Australia
Limestone Coast